The delicate mouse (Mus tenellus) is a species of rodent in the family Muridae.
It is found in Ethiopia, Kenya, Somalia, Sudan, Tanzania, and possibly Eritrea.
Its natural habitat is dry savanna.

References

Mus (rodent)
Mammals described in 1903
Taxa named by Oldfield Thomas
Taxonomy articles created by Polbot